Julianne MacLean is a Canadian author of romance novels, primarily historical romance. She lives in Nova Scotia.

Maclean earned a bachelor's degree in English literature from the University of King's College in 1987. She went back to school to study accounting, and in 1992 received a degree in Business Administration with a major in Accounting. She worked in the Office of the Auditor General before quitting to focus on writing her romance novels. She sold her first novel, Prairie Bride, to Harlequin in 1999.

In 2005, her novel Love According to Lily won the Romantic Times Reviewers' Choice Best Regency-Set Historical Romance Award.

Bibliography
By publisher

Harlequin Historical
 Prairie Bride, 2000
 The Marshal and Mrs. O'Malley, 2001
 Adam's Promise, 2003

Silhouette Desire
 Sleeping with the Playboy, 2003

Avon/HarperCollins

American Heiress Series
 To Marry the Duke, 2003
 An Affair Most Wicked, 2004
 My Own Private Hero, 2004
 Love According to Lily, 2005
 Portrait of a Lover, 2006
 Surrender to a Scoundrel, 2007

Pembroke Palace Series
 In My Wildest Fantasies, 2007
 The Mistress Diaries, 2008
 When a Stranger Loves Me, 2009
 Married By Midnight, 2012
 A Kiss Before the Wedding, 2012
 Seduced at Sunset, 2013

St. Martin’s Press

The Highlander Trilogy
 Captured by the Highlander, 2011
 Claimed by the Highlander, 2011
 Seduced by the Highlander, 2011

The Royal Trilogy
 Be My Prince, April 2012
 Princess in Love, October 2012
 The Prince's Bride, April 2013

Self-published
 The Color of Heaven (as E.V. Mitchell), 2011
 Taken by the Cowboy, 2011
 "The Rebel" (a short story prequel to the Highlander Trilogy), 2011

References

External links
 Julianne MacLean’s website
 Julianne MacLean at RT Book Reviews
 Julianne MacLean at HarperCollins
 Julianne MacLean at Macmillan

Canadian romantic fiction writers
Canadian women novelists
Writers from Nova Scotia
Living people
Women romantic fiction writers
Year of birth missing (living people)